The Sentul Barat MRT station is a mass rapid transit (MRT) underground station that serves the suburb of Sentul in northern-central Kuala Lumpur, Malaysia. It is part of the MRT Putrajaya Line.

Station details

Location 
The station is located along Jalan Sultan Azlan Shah.

Exits and entrances 
The station consists of 2 entrances for now. Entrance B is located on the west side of Jalan Ipoh serving Kampung Kasipillay, while Entrance C is located to the east side of Jalan Ipoh serving the Sentul West and Taman Million neighborhoods. Entrance A has not been built and it is reserved for future integration.

Planned interchange
It was previously planned to be an interchange station with the MRT Circle Line (MRT3) under the old alignment.

Feeder buses
Rapid KL 151, 173, 190, 191

References

External links
 Klang Valley Mass Rapid Transit website
 MRT Hawk-Eye View

Rapid transit stations in Kuala Lumpur
Sungai Buloh-Serdang-Putrajaya Line
Railway stations scheduled to open in 2023